Crüger is a lunar impact crater that is located in the western part of the Moon, to the northeast of the much larger walled plain Darwin.

The most distinctive feature about this crater is very dark interior floor that is one of the lowest albedo features on the Moon. The surface has been covered in basaltic lava and has only been exposed to a minimal amount of deposition from impact ejecta. The floor is nearly featureless, with only a tiny craterlet near the center and few other even more diminutive impacts. The outer rim is low and nearly circular, and has not been significantly reshaped by impacts.

Satellite craters
By convention these features are identified on lunar maps by placing the letter on the side of the crater midpoint that is closest to Crüger.

References

 
 
 
 
 
 
 
 
 
 
 
 

Impact craters on the Moon